Píšť is a municipality and village in Pelhřimov District in the Vysočina Region of the Czech Republic. It has about 90 inhabitants.

Administrative parts
The village of Vranice is an administrative part of Píšť.

References

Villages in Pelhřimov District